The 2011–12 Ukrainian Cup  is the 21st annual season of Ukraine's football knockout competition, and fourth under the name of DATAGROUP – Football Ukraine Cup.

The Cup begins with two preliminary rounds, before the first round proper involving the Premier League clubs. The draw for both the preliminary rounds was held on July 7, 2011. The First Preliminary Round consists of teams from Druha Liha and Amateur Cup finalists. In the Second Preliminary Round teams of the Persha Liha enter the competition. Sixteen teams, the winners of the 2nd preliminary round, enter the First Round proper or the Round of 32 where the Premier League teams enter the competition for the first time. The winner of the competition qualifies for the play-off round of the 2012–13 UEFA Europa League.

Shakhtar Donetsk were the defending Ukrainian Cup champions and as a member of the Premier League enter the competition in the Round of 32. Shakhtar Donetsk retained the cup by defeating FC Metalurh Donetsk 2–1 in the final.

Team allocation 

Fifty eight teams entered the Ukrainian Cup competition.

Distribution

Round and draw dates
All draws held at FFU headquarters (Building of Football) in Kyiv unless stated otherwise.

Competition schedule

First Preliminary Round (1/64)
In this round entered 18 clubs from the Druha Liha, the finalists of Ukrainian Amateur Cup. The round matches were played on July 16, 2011.

Notes:
 Makiyivvuhillya Makiyivka were drawn to play away against Bastion Illichivsk but they withdrew from the professional ranks prior to the start of the 2011–12 season.
Makiyivvuhillya Makiyivka received a bye.

  Slovkhlib Slovyansk were drawn to play at home against Zhytychi Zhytomyr but they failed attestation and were not admitted to the PFL. Slovkhlib Slovyansk received a bye.

 Desna Chernihiv were drawn to play at home against Nyva Ternopil but they withdrew from the Cup competition having not completed attestation awaiting their status in the PFL. Desna Chernihiv received a bye.

Second Preliminary Round (1/32)
In this round entered all 17 clubs from Persha Liha (except Dynamo-2 Kyiv) and the higher seeded 5 clubs and those clubs which received byes from the Druha Liha. They were drawn against the 7 winners of the First Preliminary Round. The second round matches were played on August 17, 2011.

Note:

 Match played 16 August 2011.

 Match not played. Nyva Vinnytsia informed the PFL that the club was having financial difficulties and would not arrive for the scheduled cup game against Tytan Armyansk.

Bracket

The pairings for each round were not known from the incept.

Notes:
 Asterisk (*) in a score bracket means that a club won in an extra time.

Round of 32
In this round all 16 teams from the Premier League enter the competition. They and the 16 winners from the previous round consisting of nine clubs from the First League, five clubs from the Second League, and both representatives from the amateur league are drawn in this round. The draw took place September 8, 2011 and was performed by Anatoliy Kon'kov who was invited as a guest by the Premier League.
The matches were played September 21, 2011.

Note:

 Arsenal Kyiv had been using Lobanovskyi Dynamo Stadium as a home ground during the season moved their cup game to Obolon Arena.

Round of 16
In this round enter winners from the previous round. The Premier League is represented with 12 clubs, the First League – 2, and the Second League – 2. The draw took place October 13, 2011 and was performed by the former Metalist Kharkiv player Ihor Yakubovskiy, who was invited as a guest by the Premier League. The matches were played October 26, 2011. Last season's Cup final participants Dynamo Kyiv and Shakhtar Donets'k were drawn to play against each other in this round with the Cup holders prevailing.

Quarterfinals
In this round enter the winners from the previous round. The Premier League will be represented with 7 clubs and the First League with 1 club. The draw took place March 15, 2012  and was performed by former Dynamo and Ukraine national team coach Yozhef Sabo. 
The matches were played April 11, 2012.

Semifinals
In this round enter the winners from the previous round. All participants represent the Premier League. The draw took place April 12, 2012 and performed by the Ukrainian referee Viktor Derdo. The winner of the match Metalurh-Karpaty will host the final of the Ukrainian Cup.

Final

In this round enter the winners from the previous round. All participants represent the Premier League. The Cup Final will be played May 6, 2012.

Top goalscorers
The data includes goals scored in qualifying matches as well as the rounds since the Round of 32.

Notes:

See also 
2011–12 Ukrainian Premier League
2011–12 Ukrainian First League
2011–12 Ukrainian Second League
2011–12 UEFA Europa League

References

External links
 PFL official website 
 UPL official website 

Ukrainian Cup seasons
Cup
Ukrainian Cup